Grovely railway station is located on the Ferny Grove line in Brisbane, Queensland, Australia.  It serves the Brisbane suburb of Keperra.

History
The station was upgraded in 2008 as part of the Mitchelton to Keperra duplication project. The upgrade included a new platform & footbridge.

Services
Grovely station is served by all stops Ferny Grove line services from Ferny Grove to Roma Street, Park Road, Coopers Plains and Beenleigh.

Services by platform

References

External links

Grovely station Queensland Rail
Grovely station Queensland's Railways on the Internet
[ Grovely station] TransLink travel information

Railway stations in Brisbane
Railway stations in Australia opened in 1918